Speak or SPEAK may refer to:

 Speech, the vocal form of human communication

People
 Speak (Hungarian rapper) (born 1976), known for his song and music video "Stop the War"
 Speak! (born 1987), American rapper and songwriter
 Geoffrey Lowrey Speak (1924–2000), British teacher in Hong Kong
 George Speak, English footballer

Literature and film
 Speak (Anderson novel), a 1999 novel by Laurie Halse Anderson
 Speak (film), the film based on Anderson's book
 Speak (Hall novel), a novel by Louisa Hall

Music
 Speak (band), a synthpop band from Austin, Texas
 "Speak" (Bachelor Girl song), a 2018 single by Australian pop band Bachelor Girl
 "Speak" (Godsmack song), a 2006 song by the band Godsmack
 Speak (Jimmy Needham album), 2006
 Speak (Lindsay Lohan album), the debut album by the actress Lindsay Lohan
 Speak (Londonbeat album), the debut album by the British-American dance band Londonbeat, 1988
 "Speak" (Nickel Creek song), a single by progressive bluegrass band Nickel Creek
 Speak (I and Thou album), 2012
 Speak (No-Man album), a compilation album by No-Man
 Speak (The Roches album), 1989
 Speak (Warren Dean Flandez album), 2018
 Speak!!!, the 3rd album from The Mad Capsule Markets
 "Speak", a song by Sevendust from Sevendust

Organizations
 SPEAK campaign, an animal rights campaign in Oxford
 SPEAK network, a Christian student campaigning network

Other
 Speak!, a weekday sports talk show formerly called Speak for Yourself
 SPEAK (test), the Speaking Proficiency English Assessment Kit from the Educational Testing Service
 Speak (The Tick), the pet of comic superhero The Tick
 Speak (Unix), a Unix utility 
 Speak (imprint), young adult division of the publishing company the Penguin Group
 Wii Speak, a microphone accessory for Nintendo's Wii video game console

See also
 Speech (disambiguation)
 Spic (disambiguation)